Swell Guy is a 1946 American drama film directed by Frank Tuttle and starring Sonny Tufts and Ann Blyth. The film's screenplay by Richard Brooks is based on the 1921 play The Hero by Gilbert Emery.

Plot 

Almost no one in his California hometown knows what a scoundrel and cad Jim Duncan is. He has been away working as a war correspondent, but has lost his job and abandoned a wife.

Jim stays at his family's home for months for free, tricks people into paying his way, gambles and romantically pursues socialite Marian Tyler, even though she is seeing another man, Mike O'Connor. Her father is also the boss of Jim's brother, Martin.

Up to his old ways, running up debts, Jim is asked to leave by Sarah, his mother. He goes to Los Angeles, but is followed by Marian, who is pregnant by him. She realizes he does not love her. Mike offers to marry Marian, even though she is expecting another man's child.

Others continue to mistakenly believe Jim to be a nice guy, including his brother and also Tony, a nephew who idolizes him. Tony makes the mistake of emulating Jim one day, walking down a railroad track. Jim saves him just in time, but at the cost of his own life, leaving friends and relatives remembering him as "a swell guy."

Cast 

 Sonny Tufts as Jim Duncan
 Ann Blyth as Marian Tyler
 Ruth Warrick as Ann Duncan
 William Gargan as Martin Duncan
 Mary Nash as Sarah Duncan
 Thomas Gomez as Dave Vinson
 John Craven as Mike O'Connor
 Millard Mitchell as Steve
 John Litel as Arthur Tyler
 Donald Devlin as Tony Duncan
 Vince Barnett as Sam Burns
 Patrick McVey as Ray Link.

References

External links

1946 films
1946 drama films
American black-and-white films
American drama films
American films based on plays
1940s English-language films
Films directed by Frank Tuttle
Films scored by Frank Skinner
Universal Pictures films
1940s American films